

Saint-Roch (Somme) is a station in the Northern French city of Amiens. The station was opened in 1847 when the line from Amiens to Abbeville opened. The station was heavily bombarded during the nights of 18 and 20 May 1940, but the building escaped relatively unscathed. It did not escape the allied bombardments of 1942 and 1944 and was rebuilt by Pierre Dufau in 1945.

Services

The station is served by regional trains to Calais, Rouen and Amiens.

References

Buildings and structures in Amiens
Railway stations in Somme (department)
Railway stations in France opened in 1847